Saakin is a band from Islamabad, Pakistan. Formed in 2011, the group's line-up consists of drummer Ibrahim Akram, guitarist Ali Hamdani, vocalist Usman Shakeel, pianist Varqa Faraid and bass guitarist Parham Faraid. Saakin won the Lux Style Award for Best Emerging Talent in Music in 2019.

Members 
Ibrahim Akram – drums
Ali Hamdani – guitars
Usman Shakeel – vocals
Varqa Faraid – keyboards
Parham Faraid – bass

Discography
Singles
"Saqi-e-Bawafa"
"Sik Mitraan"
"Zindagi Tamasha"
"Intebah"

Awards 
In 2019, Saakin received the Lux Style Award for Best Emerging Talent in Music.

References 

Alternative rock groups
Pakistani rock music groups